Chess tournaments at the 2021 Pekan Olahraga Nasional were held between 4 October to 13 October in Hotel Swiss Bell, Merauke. 100 chess players from 23 provinces participated in events that are divided into three categories: blitz chess, rapid chess, and standard chess. Each category is composed of five events: men's team, women's team, men's individual, women's individual, and limited individual. The limited individual event is a new event for chess player ages over the age of 60.

Medal summary

Medal table

Note: "*" labels the host province

Source: PON XX Papua 2021 official website

Medalists

Men's events

Women's events 

Source: PON XX Papua 2021 official website

References

External links 
 Official website 

Chess competitions
Chess in Indonesia
2021 in chess
2021 in Indonesian sport